The Castle of Paterno is located in the town of Albaladejo, in the province of Ciudad Real, Spain.

History 

The castle is of Roman origin, later conquered by the Arabs and re-built in the 13th century. It belonged to the Orden of Santiago, who helped to maintain the castle.

Design 

It is a small rectangular fortress. The central area has not been preserved and currently there are only two towers of the castle left.

Current situation 
It is open to tourism.

Surroundings 
The Roman village of the Bridge of Olmilla: In this bridge, near Albaladejo, remains of a Roman village have been found together with interesting mosaics.

The Church of Santiago is a 16th-century church close to the castle.

Sources 
castillos.net
monumentalnet.org

Castles in Castilla–La Mancha
Castles of the Order of Santiago